Christos "Chris" Tsiprailidis (born 12 April in Greece), nicknamed Syracuse Chris, is an American professional poker player based in Syracuse, New York.

Before turning to poker as his career, Tsiprailidis he was a soccer player and worked as a chef.

Tsiprailidis has been attending the World Series of Poker (WSOP) since the early 1990s. He finished runner-up to Phil Hellmuth Jr in the $1,500 no limit Texas hold 'em event in 1993, and went on to win a WSOP bracelet in 2000 in the $3,000 limit hold 'em event.

Tsiprailidis has also made final tables on the World Poker Tour (WPT), Professional Poker Tour (PPT), and Ultimate Poker Challenge.

As of 2009, his total live tournament winnings exceed $2,450,000. His 27 cashes as the WSOP account for $501,492 of those winnings.

Tsiprailidis has four children.

References

External links
 World Poker Tour profile

American poker players
Greek poker players
Greek emigrants to the United States
Living people
World Series of Poker bracelet winners
Year of birth missing (living people)
Sportspeople from Syracuse, New York